Language technology, often called human language technology (HLT), studies methods of how computer programs or electronic devices can analyze, produce, modify or respond to human texts and speech. Working with language technology often requires broad knowledge not only about linguistics but also about computer science. It consists of natural language processing (NLP) and computational linguistics (CL) on the one hand, many application oriented aspects of these, and more low-level aspects such as encoding and speech technology on the other hand. 

Note that these elementary aspects are normally not considered to be within the scope of related terms such as natural language processing and (applied) computational linguistics, which are otherwise near-synonyms. As an example, for many of the world's lesser known languages, the foundation of language technology is providing communities with fonts and keyboard setups so their languages can be written on computers or mobile devices.

References

External links
Johns Hopkins University Human Language Technology Center of Excellence
Carnegie Mellon University Language Technologies Institute
Institute for Applied Linguistics (IULA) at Universitat Pompeu Fabra. Barcelona, Spain
German Research Centre for Artificial Intelligence (DFKI) Language Technology Lab
CLT: Centre for Language Technology in Gothenburg, Sweden
The Center for Speech and Language Technologies (CSaLT) at the Lahore University [sic] of Management Sciences (LUMS)
Globalization and Localization Association (GALA)
ScriptSource, a reference to the writing systems of the world and the remaining needs for supporting them in the computing realm.

Speech processing
Natural language processing